Jama Ali Jama is a Somali politician. He was the President of Puntland from November 14, 2001, to May 8, 2002.

Early life
Jama was born to a family from the Osman Mahmoud sub-clan of the Majeerteen Darod.

He was educated in Moscow.

Career
Jama later joined the Somali National Army, rising to the rank of colonel.

In the mid-1970s, the Soviet Union promoted Jama as the chief ideologue of socialism in the Horn of Africa. He was later imprisoned for 11 years by the regime of Mohamed Siad Barre after having been accused of participating in an abortive coup d'état. Jama was recognized by Amnesty International as a prisoner of conscience.

In November 2001, Jama was elected as President of Puntland. However, the position was contested with outgoing President Abdullahi Yusuf Ahmed, who wanted his tenure extended. Ahmed emerged victorious the following year, and served out his second term as president until October 2004.

Jama subsequently became a legislator in the Transitional Federal Parliament (TFP).

References

Year of birth missing (living people)
Living people
Place of birth missing (living people)
Members of the Transitional Federal Parliament
Presidents of Puntland
Somalian prisoners and detainees
Prisoners and detainees of Somalia